5-TFMO-DMT (5-(trifluoromethoxy)-DMT, 5-OCF3-DMT, 5-(trifluoromethoxy)-N,N-dimethyltryptamine) is a psychedelic tryptamine derivative related to drugs such as 5-MeO-DMT and DMT (DMT). It acts as an agonist at the 5-HT2A receptor with an EC50 of 127.2 nM. It was shown to release serotonin (5-HT) from synaptosomal preparations, and to reduce immobility time in the forced-swim test in animal studies, suggesting that it might have antidepressant activity.

See also
 5-MeO-DMT
 5-EtO-DMT
 5-Fluoro-DMT
 5-TFM-DMT

References 

Psychedelic tryptamines
Tryptamines
Trifluoromethoxy compounds
Dimethylamino compounds